Female Chinese beauty standards have become a well-known feature of Chinese culture. A 2018 survey conducted by the Great British Academy of Aesthetic Medicine concluded that Chinese beauty culture prioritizes an oval face shape, pointed, narrow chin, plump lips, well defined Cupid's bows, and obtuse jaw angle. The importance of feminine beauty in China has been deeply ingrained into the culture: historically, a woman's livelihood was often determined by her ability to find an eligible husband, a feat aided by fitting into the cultural ideals of beauty. 

Chinese women tend to utilize plastic surgery to enhance their ethnic features, and mirror some physical traits associated with western beauty. Values of dark, thick, and shiny hair allude to proper hygiene rituals and overall health and wellness. Similarly, pale, ivory skin, and a slim body figure have historical implications as being a physical representation of wealth and affluence. Though not as much an indicator of wealth, these values transcribed to both modern day Chinese and Western culture and continue to represent ideal beauty. 

A relatively new ideal ingrained into Chinese culture consists of the notion of having a double eyelid, a common feature of Western women. The term double eyelid refers to the prominent crease found on some people's eyelid and contradicts the more ethnic mono eyelid feature common to Chinese women. This look can be achieved temporarily by using specific cosmetic products such as tape or glue. A permanent option is to undergo a procedure titled blepharoplasty, which utilizes cosmetic surgery to reshape the eyelid.

History

The emphasis that both Taoist and Confucian notions of female beauty place on the relationship between inner and outer beauty has influenced the creation of the Chinese female beauty ideal.  To further see the history of this culture, as well as how these ideals came into place see Chinese Culture. Outer beauty was thought to represent virtuousness, talent, and other positive characteristics.

In Taoist thought, women with masculine voices make poor sexual partners, because this trait suggests an excess of ch'i that inhibits the attainment of sexual harmony. In her article "Female Bodily Aesthetics, Politics, and Feminine Ideals of Beauty," Eva Kit Wah Man articulates how Confucianism and Taoism played essential roles in the creation of Chinese beauty ideals: "In the Chinese tradition, as in other cultures, both the external sexual and inner moral dimensions determine the beauty of a woman…The notion of female beauty comes from both (Taoism and Confucianism)." "Femininity" does not refer to an aspect of a dichotomy between mind and body, as there is no such dichotomy in Chinese philosophy.  Women in China also expands on these ideals, delving into the impact women have in Chinese society.  Thus, historically, the religious influences on Chinese beauty ideals closely tied outer beauty to inner beauty. Historically, Tang Dynast preferred an oval face, willow leaf eyebrows, long thin eyes, small lips, and a slim, fragile-looking body.

Modern Chinese society is highly influenced by Western capitalist and Marxist thoughts. The Chinese would not describe themselves as a completely Capitalist country, nor a purely Marxist country. They fundamentally ignore this type of question about the essence of its political position, and develop their economy, politics, culture and feminism in their own way.  They call themselves a socialist market economy with Chinese characteristics. The rise of Chinese feminist development is highly influenced by the claims of the "new " China (since the early 19th century) and its government that it would save the Chinese woman from the "old society" and set women's minds free (Chun, 2008). An article published in the widely circulated journal Dushu uses an earlier nativist satire to argue that women themselves voluntarily desired the beauty of small feet (footbinding) into the first decades of the twentieth century, despite the elite, male-dominated discourse of liberation and equality that assailed the practice. The reason behind that, is because "但在缠足成为普通 女性生活方式的那段漫长的历史时期恰恰缠足才 被认为是女孩子最天然的身体行为缠足就如同吃 饭穿衣一样平常缠足亦是女性寻求身体美的一种 方式". Translate in English will be:

"While foot-binding was normal to the female lifestyle in history, foot-binding was considered as females' most natural physical behaviour, Foot-binding was as normal as eating a meal and wearing cloth; Foot-binding was a way of female pursuit for their ideal of body beauty."

Cultural ideas on women's beauty
Chinese culture greatly values the appearance of women. This is evidenced in the business environment as well as the social environment. John Osburg, Director of Anthropology at the University of Rochester in his book, Anxious Wealth, explores the gender relations in Post Mao China, documenting the well-known disparity that exists between men and women. A theme of his work is that the objectification of women as a commonplace in Chinese culture creates the gender inequalities that are still prevalent today.

"The vast majority of entrepreneurs in post-Mao China are men. This is largely due to the fact that business networking requires entering spaces (such as nightclubs and saunas) and participating in activities (drinking, gambling, and sex consumption) that are not viewed as appropriate for "proper" women....these networks constitute a key component of business...the bulk of the relationships of these networks are forged and maintained through ritualized leisure-experiences of shared pleasures catering to the desires and enjoyments of elite men, including karaoke clubs, saunas, nightclubs, high-end restaurants, and teahouses.

As Osburg details, the karaoke clubs, saunas, nightclubs, etc. are meant to attract the businessmen, as there are also multiple red light districts around these areas. Prostitution in China further expands on these areas and this culture. In many cases, relationships between employees, co-workers, partners, etc. are forged through these settings. Based on these traditional practices, it can be stated that it is of utmost importance then for the women to be aesthetically pleasing, further highlighting women's attempt to capture beauty, or at least capture the way it is perceived by Chinese Culture.

Hair
Advertising offers insight into the Chinese conception of beautiful hair. As of 2004, the consumption of cosmetics and hair products in China had grown over the past twenty years from 25 million US dollars to 6 billion US dollars, and brands are eager to advertise their products to the growing market.

Contemporary sinophone shampoo commercials aimed at female consumers typically portray the same beauty ideal when it comes to hair: long, shiny, dark, and sleek. The thirty second clips usually feature a solitary model with a thick, glistening mane. She may be engaged in any activity – simply lounging around the house or, as in the case of one commercial, jumping out of an airplane – and her hair is in constant motion. The commercials characterize the model's animated and lively hair as strong, shiny, long, and soft. Often, a male gaze on the model sexualizes and eroticizes the hairstyle. Sometimes a male character appears, usually to approve of or admire the gorgeous hair the product had created, but often the male gaze is implied.

Double eyelid

Double eyelids are unconditionally considered beautiful in East Asian society. The double eyelid is a crease in the small flap of skin that covers the eye. It has been estimated that 40–60% of East Asians lack this upper eyelid crease, giving them a monolid appearance. However, this is not ideal when it comes to Chinese beauty.

A study looked at which type of eyelid was considered most attractive on Chinese women. Edited photographs of young Chinese women's eyes were presented to the test participants. It found that there was significant preference for the double eyelid while the single eyelid was considered to be the least attractive. Because of this, many Chinese women go through a surgery that creates a fold in the upper eyelid giving them the double eyelid. This procedure, called blepharoplasty, typically costs around $3,000. During this 30 minute surgery, doctors cut, fold, and stitch the upper eyelids, creating a small crease above the eyelids. This operation makes the eye appear larger and more round, giving the woman a more desirable look.

Skin and body

Skin tone 
Skin tone is one aspect of Chinese beauty that is in contrast with the Western beauty ideal, as fair skin is favoured over more tanned skin. This beauty ideal of fair skin dates back as early as the Han Dynasty which controlled China from 206 BC to 220 AD. During this time a woman's skin tone was known to indicate social class. Many women of the lower class worked outside in the fields, exposing them to more sun, and ultimately making their skin darker.  On the other hand, the light skin had become a representation of social prestige and the lack of physical labor.  Due to this perception, there are a lot of pressures on women in China to stay indoors and not venture outside to work or play sports such as basketball and soccer.

Due to this obsession of obtaining fair-skin the Asia-Pacific region has become the world's largest market for skin-whitening products. These products include various creams and pills which claim to reduce a pigment called melanin in the skin. Skin lightness also impacts a woman's marital prospect, job prospect, social status, and earning potential. Products such as these advertise fairer-skin as "beautiful" and superior to darker skin. The downside to this is not only that it makes women of darker complexion feel inferior, but that these skin whitening products can come with many risky side effects. The active ingredient in many of these products is mercury which has been known to cause serious psychiatric, neurological, and kidney problems.

Body shape 
Despite popular belief, there is little evidence of Chinese people idealizing a plump body for considerable periods of time. In the Ch'un Ch'ia period (722–481 BC), Emperor Chu desired a slim waist; women in his harem often starved themselves to death in order to capture his attention. Historic trends of women developing anorexia nervosa, an eating disorder, to fit trends of beauty represents systemic psychology still influencing today's culture surrounding body image. Chinese figures such as Empress Fei-yen were renown for their small waists and continue to be glorified to this day. Alternatively, Empress Kuei-fei is known for having a heavier figure and being ridiculed by other harems. Similar to the aforementioned feet binding, waist binding was common practice; men were attracted to women who swayed when they walked due to improper hip growth.

Chinese people have long considered the ideal woman's body to be relatively tall, slim, and curvaceous. Fascination towards height has continued to increase as evidenced by Chinese beauty pageant winners, but this could correlate more to global pageant standards rather than cultural ideals. Values of fragility in Chinese culture have proven to be relatively prevalent and stable.

See also
Cosmetic surgery in China
Nowhere girls, neologism
Prostitution in China
Women in China

General:
Chinese culture
Feminine beauty ideal
Social influence

References

Female beauty
Chinese culture
Women in China